Sir Erasmus Dryden, 1st Baronet (20 December 1553 – 22 May 1632) was an English politician who sat in the House of Commons  in 1624.

Erasmus Dryden was the son of John Dryden who built Canons Ashby House, Northamptonshire. Erasmus' mother, Elizabeth Cope, was the daughter of Sir John Cope, from whose heirs the Drydens purchased the priory and village remnants of the Canons Ashby estate. Sir Erasmus Dryden was the grandfather of the poet John Dryden (through his third son, Erasmus) and he was also the uncle of Elizabeth (Dryden) Swift, who was the grandmother of Jonathan Swift. Dryden's sister-in-law, Katherine (Throckmorton) Dryden, was a first cousin of Lady Elizabeth (Throckmorton) Raleigh. He was an uncle of female Puritan preacher Anne Hutchinson.

He entered Magdalen College, Oxford, in 1571 aged 18. and was demy from 1571 to 1575 and fellow from 1575 to 1580, being awarded BA on 11 June 1577. In 1577, he was student of the Middle Temple. He was High Sheriff of Northamptonshire in 1599 and in 1618. He was created a baronet on 16 November 1619. In 1624, Dryden was elected Member of Parliament for Banbury in the Happy Parliament. 
 
Sir Erasmus Dryden married Frances Wilkes, daughter of William Wilkes of Hodnell, Warwickshire. They had 3 sons and 4 daughters. His eldest son John succeeded to the Baronetcy.
His youngest son Erasmus was the father of John Dryden, the first Poet Laureate.

References

1540s births
1632 deaths
English MPs 1624–1625
High Sheriffs of Northamptonshire
People from Banbury
Year of birth uncertain
Alumni of Magdalen College, Oxford
Members of the Middle Temple
16th-century English people
Baronets in the Baronetage of England
Dryden baronets